The Searunner 31 is a trimaran sailboat designed by Jim Brown in the 1960s.

Reception

See also
List of multihulls
Jim Brown
Searunner 25
Searunner 37
Searunner 40

References

Trimarans